WVOK may refer to:

 WVOK (AM), a radio station (1580 AM) licensed to Oxford, Alabama, United States
 WVOK-FM, a radio station (97.9 FM) licensed to Oxford, Alabama